Shimamoto (written: 島本 or 嶋本) is a Japanese surname. Notable people with the surname include:

, Japanese manga artist
, Japanese weightlifter
, Japanese writer
, Japanese gravure idol
, Japanese shogi player
, Japanese artist
, Japanese voice actress

See also
Shimamoto, Osaka, a town in Mishima District, Osaka Prefecture, Japan
Shimamoto Station, a railway station in Shimamoto, Osaka

Japanese-language surnames